S. darwini may refer to:

Sapphirina darwini
Scenopinus darwini
Scolytogenes darwini
Scolytomimus darwini
Semicossyphus darwini
Semiformiceras darwini, an ammonite species in the genus Semiformiceras marking a zone in the Tithonian stage of the Jurassic period
Senoculus darwini, a spider species found in Argentina
Spurlingia darwini
Stenaelurillus darwini, a jumping spider species found in Tanzania
Stenoconchyoptera darwini
Stylatula darwini
Szuletaia darwini

See also
 S. darwinii (disambiguation)
 Darwini (disambiguation)